The list of political families of Kerala state of India:

Pinarayi Vijayan Family
Pinarayi Vijayan, Current Chief Minister of Kerala (25-5-2016 - present).
P. A. Mohammed Riyas,Son-In-Law,Current Minister of Public Works Department and Tourism (25-5-2021 - present)

K. Karunakaran Family
K. Karunakaran, former Kerala chief minister
K. Muraleedharan, Son, Lok Sabha member
Padmaja Venugopal, Daughter, Congress General Secretary

K.M. Mani Family
 K. M. Mani, former Minister of Finance
Jose K. Mani,Son, Rajya Sabha member

K. Narayanakururupp Family
K. Narayana Kurup Former Transport minister
N. Jayaraj, Son, Chief Vip Kerala Government 

C. H. Mohammed Koya Family
 C. H. Mohammed Koya, former Chief Minister (12 October 1979 to 1 December 1979)
 M. K. Muneer, Son, former Minister Social Welfare and Panchayat and PWD

T. M. Jacob Family 
 T.M.Jacob, former Food and Civil Supplies Minister
 Anoop Jacob, Son, MLA

P.R. Kurup Family
 P. R. Kurup, former Cabinet Minister
 K. P. Mohanan Son, former minister

Baby John Family
 Baby John, former Cabinet Minister for Irrigation
 Shibu Baby John, Son, former Minister for Labour

 
Kerala
Lists of people from Kerala
Kerala politics-related lists